Janine Cirincione (born 1961) is an American curator and multimedia artist. She is the co-director of Sean Kelly Gallery and was formerly the director of the Tilton Gallery where she curated “School Days” in 2006 and “Through the Looking Glass: Artists’ First Encounters with Virtual Reality” in 1992. From 1993-1994, she was an artist in residence at the Wexner Center for the Arts along with Brian D'Amato and Michael Ferraro. Her project, "Real Life," (2001) created 2D animated characters which reacted to the real world of the gallery environment via sensors. Cirincione has also been the president of content development at PossibleWorlds.

References

Living people
1961 births
Place of birth missing (living people)
20th-century American artists
21st-century American artists
20th-century American women artists
21st-century American women artists
American contemporary artists
American multimedia artists